Entrevennes is a commune in the Alpes-de-Haute-Provence department in southeastern France. 
In French, its inhabitants are referred to with the demonym "Entrevennois".

Population

Personalities
The troubadour Isnart d'Entrevenas was lord of Entrevennes in the early thirteenth century.

See also
Communes of the Alpes-de-Haute-Provence department

References

Communes of Alpes-de-Haute-Provence
Alpes-de-Haute-Provence communes articles needing translation from French Wikipedia